Joe Thomas (Muskogee, Oklahoma, 23 December 1908 - 15 April 1997), was an alto saxophonist and songwriter. He was the brother of Walter "Foots" Thomas. He first went to New York City with Jelly Roll Morton in 1929. He then worked with Blanche Calloway and other bands during the 1930s, and with jazz musician Dave Martin during the early 1940s. He gave up playing to become a vocal coach and songwriter and later an A&R executive.

References

1908 births
1997 deaths
American jazz alto saxophonists
American male saxophonists
Songwriters from Oklahoma
American male jazz musicians
20th-century American male musicians
American male songwriters
20th-century American saxophonists